The 1998 Boston Red Sox season was the 98th season in the franchise's Major League Baseball history. The Red Sox finished second in the American League East with a record of 92 wins and 70 losses, 22 games behind the New York Yankees, who went on to win the 1998 World Series. The Red Sox qualified for the postseason as the AL wild card, but lost to the American League Central champion Cleveland Indians in the ALDS.

Offseason 
 November 6, 1997: Jim Leyritz was traded by the Texas Rangers with Damon Buford to the Boston Red Sox for Mark Brandenburg, Bill Haselman, and Aaron Sele.
 November 17, 1997: Bret Saberhagen was signed as a free agent with the Boston Red Sox.
 November 18, 1997: Pedro Martínez was traded by the Montreal Expos to the Boston Red Sox for a player to be named later and Carl Pavano. The Boston Red Sox sent Tony Armas (December 18, 1997) to the Montreal Expos to complete the trade.
 November 18, 1997: Jeff Suppan was selected by the Arizona Diamondbacks in the 1997 Major League Baseball expansion draft.
 November 18, 1997: Jim Mecir was selected by the Tampa Bay Devil Rays in the 1997 Major League Baseball expansion draft.
 November 21, 1997: Mike Benjamin was signed as a free agent with the Boston Red Sox.
 March 19, 1998: Midre Cummings was selected off waivers by the Boston Red Sox from the Cincinnati Reds.

Regular season

Season standings

Record vs. opponents

Notable transactions 
 June 2, 1998: Mark Teixeira was drafted by the Boston Red Sox in the 9th round of the 1998 amateur draft, but did not sign.
 June 20, 1998: Jim Leyritz was traded by the Boston Red Sox with Ethan Faggett (minors) to the San Diego Padres for Carlos Reyes, Mandy Romero, and Darío Veras.
 July 30, 1998: Pete Munro and Jay Yennaco were traded to the Toronto Blue Jays for Mike Stanley.
 July 31, 1998: Greg Swindell was traded by the Minnesota Twins with Orlando Merced to the Boston Red Sox for John Barnes, Matt Kinney, and Joe Thomas (minors).
 August 6, 1998: Pete Schourek was purchased from the Houston Astros.

Opening Day lineup

Roster

Player stats

Batting

Starters by position 
Note: Pos = Position; G = Games played; AB = At bats; R = Runs; H = Hits; HR = Home runs; RBI = Runs batted in; Avg. = Batting average; Slg. = Slugging average; SB = Stolen bases

Other batters 
Note: G = Games played; AB = At bats; H = Hits; Avg. = Batting average; HR = Home runs; RBI = Runs batted in, SB = Stolen bases

Pitching

Starting pitchers 
Note: G = Games pitched; GS = Games started; IP = Innings pitched; W = Wins; L = Losses; SV = Saves; ERA = Earned run average; SO = Strikeouts

Relief pitchers 
Note: G = Games pitched; GS = Games started; IP = Innings pitched; W = Wins; L = Losses; SV = Saves; ERA = Earned run average; SO = Strikeouts

Other pitchers 
Note: G = Games pitched; GS = Games started; IP = Innings pitched; W = Wins; L = Losses; SV = Saves; ERA = Earned run average; SO = Strikeouts

ALDS

Game 1

Game 2

Game 3

Game 4

Awards and honors 
All-Star Game
 Tom Gordon, reserve P
 Pedro Martínez, reserve P
 Mo Vaughn, reserve 1B (did not attend)

Game log 

|- style="text-align:center; background-color:#bfb;"
| 1 || April 1 || @ Athletics  || 2–0 || Martínez (1–0) || Candiotti (0–1) || Gordon (1) || Network Associates Coliseum || 36,915 || 1–0 || W1
|- style="text-align:center; background-color:#bfb;"
| 2 || April 2 || @ Athletics  || 6–3 || Wasdin (1–0) || Taylor (0–1) || Gordon (2) || Network Associates Coliseum || 7,313  || 2–0 || W2
|- style="text-align:center; background-color:#fbb;"
| 3 || April 3 || @ Mariners  || 6–11 || Cloude (1–0)  || Lowe (0–1) || — || Kingdome || 27,553 || 2–1 || L1
|- style="text-align:center; background-color:#fbb;"
| 4 || April 4 || @ Mariners  || 6–12 || Swift (1–0)  || Rose (0–1)  || — || Kingdome || 43,035 || 2–2 || L2
|- style="text-align:center; background-color:#bfb;"
| 5 || April 5 || @ Mariners || 10–5 || Saberhagen (1–0) || Johnson (0–1) || — || Kingdome || 35,143 || 3–2 || W1
|- style="text-align:center; background-color:#fbb;"
| 6 || April 6 || @ Angels  || 1–2 (11)|| Holtz (1–0) || Gordon (0–1) || — || Edison Field || 21,352 || 3–3 || L1
|- style="text-align:center; background-color:#fbb;"
| 7 || April 7 || @ Angels  || 1–6 || Hill (2–0) || Wakefield (0–1) || — || Edison Field || 19,926 || 3–4 || L2
|- style="text-align:center; background-color:#fbb;"
| 8 || April 8 || @ Angels  || 1–2  || McDowell (1–1) || Lowe (0–2) || Percival (2) || Edison Field || 24,450 || 3–5 || L3
|- style="text-align:center; background-color:#bfb"
| 9 || April 10 || Mariners || 9–7 || Garcés (1–0) || Timlin (0–1) || — || Fenway Park || 32,805 || 4–5 || W1
|- style="text-align:center; background-color:#bfb"
| 10 || April 11 || Mariners || 5–0 || Martínez (2–0) || Moyer (1–2) || — || Fenway Park || 32,403 || 5–5 || W2
|- style="text-align:center; background-color:#bfb"
| 11 || April 12 || Mariners || 8–7 || Wasdin (2–0) || Slocumb (0–1) || — || Fenway Park || 23,270 || 6–5 || W3
|- style="text-align:center; background-color:#bfb"
| 12 || April 13 || Athletics || 6–3 || Saberhagen (2–0) || Rogers (1–1) || Gordon (3) || Fenway Park || 18,011 || 7–5 || W4
|- style="text-align:center; background-color:#bfb"
| 13 || April 14 || Athletics || 8–6 || Gordon (1–1) || Taylor (0–2) || — || Fenway Park || 18,490 || 8–5 || W5
|- style="text-align:center; background-color:#bfb"
| 14 || April 15 || Athletics || 4–3 || Eckersley (1–0) || Mathews (0–2) || — || Fenway Park || 18,477 || 9–5 || W6
|- style="text-align:center; background-color:#bfb"
| 15 || April 17 || Indians || 3–2 (10)|| Gordon (2–1) || Assenmacher (1–2) || — || Fenway Park || 26,924 || 10–5 || W7
|- style="text-align:center; background-color:#fbb;"
| 16 || April 18 || Indians || 4–7 || Martin (1–0) || Eckersley (1–1) || Jackson (7) || Fenway Park || 31,735 || 10–6 || L1
|- style="text-align:center; background-color:#bfb;"
| 17 || April 19 || Indians || 2–0 || Saberhagen (3–0) || Burba (2–2) || Gordon (4) || Fenway Park || 31,846 || 11–6 || W1
|- style="text-align:center; background-color:#bfb;"
| 18 || April 20 || Indians || 6–5 (11)|| Gordon (3–1) || Plunk (1–1) || — || Fenway Park || 33,001 || 12–6 || W2
|- style="text-align:center; background-color:#bfb;"
| 19 || April 21 || @ Tigers || 11–4 || Rose (1–1) || Worrell (1–3) || — || Tiger Stadium || 10,022 || 13–6 || W3
|- style="text-align:center; background-color:#bfb;"
| 20 || April 22 || @ Tigers  || 8–5 || Corsi (1–0) || Jones (0–1) || Gordon (5) || Tiger Stadium || 10,102 || 14–6 || W4
|- style="text-align:center; background-color:#bfb;"
| 21 || April 24 || @ Indians || 7–5 || Wakefield (1–1) || Burba (2–3) || Gordon (6) || Jacobs Field || 40,570 || 15–6 || W5
|- style="text-align:center; background-color:#fbb;"
| 22 || April 25 || @ Indians  || 3–2 || Saberhagen (4–0) || Colón (1–1) || Gordon (7) || Jacobs Field || 40,571 || 16–6 || W6
|- style="text-align:center; background-color:#bbb"
| — || April 26 || Tigers  || colspan=8|Postponed (rain). Makeup date July 21.
|- style="text-align:center; background-color:#bfb;"
| 23 || April 27 || Tigers  || 6–5 || Eckersley (2–1) || Runyan (0–2) || Gordon (8) || Fenway Park || 18,456 || 17–6 || W7
|- style="text-align:center; background-color:#fbb;"
| 24 || April 28 || Tigers  || 5–7 || Florie (2–0) || Shouse (0–1) || Jones (3) || Fenway Park || 20,936 || 17–7 || L1
|- style="text-align:center; background-color:#bfb;"
| 25 || April 29 || Angels  || 8–4 || Wakefield (2–1) || Watson (1–3) || Gordon (9) || Fenway Park || 21,557 || 18–7 || W1
|- style="text-align:center; background-color:#fbb;"
| 26 || April 30 || Angels  || 2–7 || Hill (5–1) || Checo (0–1) || — || Fenway Park || 21,526 || 18–8 || L1
|-

|- style="text-align:center; background-color:#bfb"
| 27 || May 1 || Rangers || 5–3 || Wasdin (3–0) || Sele (5–1) || Gordon (10) || Fenway Park || 24,169 || 19–8 || W2
|- style="text-align:center; background-color:#fbb"
| 28 || May 2 || Rangers || 6–7 || Helling (6–0) || Rose (1–2) || Wetteland (7) || Fenway Park || 25,827 || 19–9 || L1 
|- style="text-align:center; background-color:#bfb;"
| 29 || May 3 || Rangers || 2–1 || Martínez (3–0) || Oliver (1–4) || Gordon (11) || Fenway Park || 28,075 || 20–9 || W1 
|- style="text-align:center; background-color:#bfb;"
| 30 || May 5 || Twins || 4–2 || Wakefield (3–1) || Tewksbury (3–4) || Gordon (12) || Fenway Park || 20,882 || 21–9 || W2
|- style="text-align:center; background-color:#fbb;"
| 31 || May 6 || Twins || 7–8 || Hawkins (1–3) || Checo (0–2) || — || Fenway Park || 20,945 || 21–10 || L1 
|- style="text-align:center; background-color:#fbb;"
| 32 || May 7 || @ Royals || 3–5 || Rapp (2–3) || Rose (1–3) || Montgomery (7) || Kauffman Stadium || 14,703 || 21–11 || L2 
|- style="text-align:center; background-color:#bfb;"
| 33 || May 8 || @ Royals || 14–3 || Saberhagen (5–0) || Haney (2–3) || Garcés (1) || Kauffman Stadium || 24,439 || 22–11 || W1 
|- style="text-align:center; background-color:#bfb;"
| 34 || May 9 || @ Royals || 3–1 || Martínez (4–0) || Belcher (1–5) || Gordon (13) || Kauffman Stadium || 18,035 || 23–11 || W2 
|- style="text-align:center; background-color:#bfb;"
| 35 || May 10 || @ Royals || 3–1 || Wakefield (4–1) || Rosado (0–2) || Gordon (14) || Kauffman Stadium || 14,793 || 24–11 || W3
|- style="text-align:center; background-color:#fbb;"
| 36 || May 11 || @ Rangers || 2–8 || Witt (4–1) || Wasdin (3–1) || — || The Ballpark in Arlington || 40,275 || 24–12 || L1 
|- style="text-align:center; background-color:#fbb;"
| 37 || May 12 || @ Rangers || 3–6 || Sele (6–2) || Rose (1–4) || Wetteland (10) || The Ballpark in Arlington || 39,614 || 24–13 || L2 
|- style="text-align:center; background-color:#fbb;"
| 38 || May 13 || @ Twins || 4–7 || Radke (4–3) || Saberhagen (5–1) || Aguilera (7) || Metrodome || 9,076 || 24–14 || L3 
|- style="text-align:center; background-color:#fbb"
| 39 || May 14 || @ Twins || 1–2 (12)|| Trombley (1–1) || Wasdin (3–2) || — || Metrodome || 12,121 || 24–15 || L4 
|- style="text-align:center; background-color:#bfb"
| 40 || May 15 || Royals || 5–2 || Wakefield (5–1) || Rosado (0–3) || Eckersley (1) || Fenway Park || 31,466 || 25–15 || W1 
|- style="text-align:center; background-color:#bfb"
| 41 || May 16 || Royals || 5–0 || Avery (1–0) || Walker (0–1) || Gordon (15) || Fenway Park || 31,700 || 26–15 || W2 
|- style="text-align:center; background-color:#bfb"
| 42 || May 17 || Royals || 5–3 || Mahay (1–0) || Rusch (3–6) || Gordon (16) || Fenway Park || 29,736 || 27–15 || W3 
|- style="text-align:center; background-color:#fbb"
| 43 || May 19 || White Sox || 5–9 || Bere (2–4) || Saberhagen (5–2) || — || Fenway Park || 27,121 || 27–16 || L1
|- style="text-align:center; background-color:#bfb"
| 44 || May 20 || White Sox || 6–2 || Martínez (5–0) || Navarro (4–4) || Gordon (17) || Fenway Park || 26,953 || 28–16 || W1
|- style="text-align:center; background-color:#bfb"
| 45 || May 22 || Yankees || 5–4 || Wakefield (6–1) || Nelson (1–1) || Gordon (18) || Fenway Park || 33,605 || 29–16 || W2 
|- style="text-align:center; background-color:#fbb;"
| 46 || May 23 || Yankees || 3–12 || Wells (6–1) || Lowe (0–3) || — || Fenway Park || 33,120 || 29–17 || L1 
|- style="text-align:center; background-color:#fbb;"
| 47 || May 24 || Yankees || 4–14 || Cone (6–1) || Saberhagen (5–3) || — || Fenway Park || 33,042 || 29–18 || L2 
|- style="text-align:center; background-color:#fbb;"
| 48 || May 25 || Blue Jays || 5–7 || Hentgen (7–3) || Martínez (5–1) || Myers (11) || Fenway Park || 32,342 || 29–19 || L3 
|- style="text-align:center; background-color:#fbb"
| 49 || May 26 || Blue Jays || 2–5 || Guzmán (3–6) || Avery (1–1) || Myers (12) || Fenway Park || 27,668 || 29–20 || L4 
|- style="text-align:center; background-color:#fbb"
| 50 || May 28 || @ Yankees || 3–8 || Wells (7–1) || Wakefield (6–2) || Stanton (5) || Yankee Stadium || 42,182 || 29–21 || L5 
|- style="text-align:center; background-color:#fbb"
| 51 || May 29 || @ Yankees || 2–6 || Cone (7–1) || Lowe (0–4) || — || Yankee Stadium || 47,160 || 29–22 || L6 
|- style="text-align:center; background-color:#bfb"
| 52 || May 30 || @ Yankees || 3–2 || Saberhagen (6–3) || Irabu (4–1) || Gordon (19) || Yankee Stadium || 55,191 || 30–22 || W1 
|- style="text-align:center; background-color:#bfb"
| 53 || May 31 || @ Yankees || 13–7 || Martínez (6–1) || Pettitte (6–5) || — || Yankee Stadium || 55,711 || 31–22 || W2 
|-

|- style="text-align:center; background-color:#bfb;"
| 54 || June 1 || @ Blue Jays || 9–5 || Corsi (2–1) || Myers (2–1) || — || Skydome || 27,372 || 32–22 || W3 
|- style="text-align:center; background-color:#bfb;"
| 55 || June 2 || @ Blue Jays || 11–3 || Avery (2–1) || Carpenter (1–2) || — || Skydome || 26,177 || 33–22 || W4
|- style="text-align:center; background-color:#fbb;"
| 56 || June 3 || Orioles || 0–3 || Johns (2–1) || Lowe (0–5) || Rhodes (2) || Fenway Park || 31,355 || 33–23 || L1
|- style="text-align:center; background-color:#bfb"
| 57 || June 4 || Orioles || 9–1 || Saberhagen (7–3) || Ponson (0–3) || — || Fenway Park || 33,104 || 34–23 || W1
|- style="text-align:center; background-color:#fbb"
| 58 || June 5 || Mets || 2–9 || Leiter (6–3) || Martínez (6–2) || — || Fenway Park || 32,214 || 34–24 || L1 
|- style="text-align:center; background-color:#fbb"
| 59 || June 6 || Mets || 0–1 || Jones (5–3) || Wakefield (6–3) || Franco (13) || Fenway Park || 32,525 || 34–25 || L2 
|- style="text-align:center; background-color:#bfb"
| 60 || June 7 ||Mets || 5–0 || Avery (3–1) || Yoshii (4–2) || — || Fenway Park || 30,630 || 35–25 || W1
|- style="text-align:center; background-color:#fbb"
| 61 || June 8 || @ Braves || 6–7 || Embree (1–0) || Wasdin (3–3) || — || Turner Field || 44,018 || 35–26 || L1 
|- style="text-align:center; background-color:#bfb"
| 62 || June 9 || @ Braves || 9–3 || Saberhagen (8–3) || Martínez (2–3) || — || Turner Field || 43,121 || 36–26 || W1
|- style="text-align:center; background-color:#bfb;"
| 63 || June 10 || @ Braves || 10–6 || Martínez (7–2) || Neagle (7–4) || — || Turner Field || 41,345 || 37–26 || W2
|- style="text-align:center; background-color:#bfb;"
| 64 || June 12 || Devil Rays || 5–1 || Wakefield (7–3) || Arrojo (8–4) || — || Fenway Park || 31,994 || 38–26 || W3
|- style="text-align:center; background-color:#bbb"
| — || June 13 || Devil Rays  || colspan=8|Postponed (rain). Makeup date September 21.
|- style="text-align:center; background-color:#bfb;"
| 65 || June 14 || Devil Rays || 3–2 (10)|| Gordon (4–1) || Lopez (2–2) || — || Fenway Park || 27,768 || 39–26 || W4
|- style="text-align:center; background-color:#fbb;"
| 66 || June 15 || @ White Sox || 2–3 || Parque (2–0) || Saberhagen (8–4) || Karchner (8) || Comiskey Park || 16,103 || 39–27 || L1 
|- style="text-align:center; background-color:#bfb;"
| 67 || June 16 || @ White Sox || 6–1 || Martínez (8–2) || Bere (3–6) || — || Comiskey Park || 13,483 || 40–27 || W1
|- style="text-align:center; background-color:#bfb;"
| 68 || June 17 || @ White Sox || 12–5 || Wakefield (8–3) || Eyre (1–7) || Gordon (20) || Comiskey Park || 13,563 || 41–27 || W1
|- style="text-align:center; background-color:#bfb;"
| 69 || June 18 || @ Devil Rays || 7–5 (10)|| Wasdin (4–3) || Yan (4–1) || Gordon (21) || Tropicana Field || 30,177 || 42–27 || W2
|- style="text-align:center; background-color:#bfb;"
| 70 || June 19 || @ Devil Rays || 4–1 || Avery (4–1) || Saunders (1–7) || Gordon (22) || Tropicana Field || 32,375 || 43–27 || W3 
|- style="text-align:center; background-color:#fbb;"
| 71 || June 20 || @ Devil Rays || 5–8 || Santana (2–0) || Saberhagen (8–5) || Hernández (15) || Tropicana Field || 41,169 || 43–28 || L1
|- style="text-align:center; background-color:#bfb;"
| 72 || June 21 || @ Devil Rays || 3–1 || Martínez (9–2) || Johnson (2–4) || Gordon (23) || Tropicana Field || 40,348 || 44–28 || W1
|- style="text-align:center; background-color:#fbb"
| 73 || June 22 || Phillies || 8–9 (10)|| Gomes (6–2) || Gordon (4–2) || Leiter (14) || Fenway Park || 33,592 || 44–29 || L1
|- style="text-align:center; background-color:#fbb"
| 74 || June 23 || Phillies || 2–3 || Portugal (3–2) || Lowe (0–6) || — || Fenway Park || 33,212 || 44–30 || L2 
|- style="text-align:center; background-color:#fbb"
| 75 || June 24 || Phillies || 8–11 || Loewer (2–0) || Avery (4–2) || Leiter (15) || Fenway Park || 28,079 || 44–31 || L3
|- style="text-align:center; background-color:#bfb"
| 76 || June 25 || Phillies || 7–5 || Saberhagen (9–5) || Beech (3–5) || Mahay (1) || Fenway Park || 28,263 || 45–31 || W1
|- style="text-align:center; background-color:#bfb"
| 77 || June 26 || @ Marlins || 6–1 || Martínez (10–2) || Fontenot (0–6) || — || Pro Player Stadium || 23,792 || 46–31 || W2
|- style="text-align:center; background-color:#bfb"
| 78 || June 27 || @ Marlins || 9–4 || Wakefield (9–3) || Sánchez (3–5) || — || Pro Player Stadium || 31,212 || 47–31 || W3
|- style="text-align:center; background-color:#fbb;"
| 79 || June 28 || @ Marlins || 1–5 || Dempster (1–3) || Lowe (0–7) || Alfonseca (3) || Pro Player Stadium || 28,418 || 47–32 || L1
|- style="text-align:center; background-color:#bfb;"
| 80 || June 30 || Expos || 7–4 || Avery (5–2) || Pérez (6–8) || Gordon (24) || Fenway Park || 27,704 || 48–32 || W1
|-

|- style="text-align:center; background-color:#bfb;"
| 81 || July 1 || Expos || 6–1 || Saberhagen (10–5) || Hermanson (6–7) || — || Fenway Park || 24,923 || 49–32 || W2
|- style="text-align:center; background-color:#bfb"
| 82 || July 2 || Expos || 15–0 || Martínez (11–2) || Pavano (2–2) || — || Fenway Park || 32,637 || 50–32 || W3
|- style="text-align:center; background-color:#bfb"
| 83 || July 3 || White Sox  || 15–2 || Wakefield (10–3) || Sirotka (8–8) || — || Fenway Park || 32,467 || 51–32 || W4
|- style="text-align:center; background-color:#fbb"
| 84 || July 4 || White Sox  || 0–3 || Snyder (1–0) || Cho (0–1) || Simas (5) || Fenway Park || 29,600 || 51–33 || L1
|- style="text-align:center; background-color:#bfb;"
| 85 || July 5 || White Sox || 15–14 || Reyes (3–2) || Howry (0–1) || Gordon (25) || Fenway Park || 32,970 || 52–33 || W1
|- style="text-align:center; background-color:#fbb;"
| 86 || July 9 || @ Orioles || 2–3 || Orosco (2–1) || Corsi (2–1) || Benítez (10) || Camden Yards || 48,014 || 52–34 || L1
|- style="text-align:center; background-color:#fbb;"
| 87 || July 10 || @ Orioles || 2–3 || Orosco (3–1) || Martínez (11–3) || Benítez (11) || Camden Yards || 48,043 || 52–35 || L2
|- style="text-align:center; background-color:#fbb"
| 88 || July 11 || @ Orioles || 1–2 || Erickson (9–7) || Wakefield (10–4) || Orosco (6) || Camden Yards || 48,244 || 52–36 || L3
|- style="text-align:center; background-color:#fbb"
| 89 || July 12 || @ Orioles || 7–11 || Johns (3–2) || Cho (0–2) || Mills (1) || Camden Yards || 48,193 || 52–37 || L4 
|- style="text-align:center; background-color:#bfb"
| 90 || July 13 || @ Devil Rays || 2–0 || Avery (6–2) || Santana (2–2) || Gordon (26) || Tropicana Field || 29,186 || 53–37 || W1
|- style="text-align:center; background-color:#fbb"
| 91 || July 14 || @ Devil Rays  || 4–5 || Lopez (5–2) || Mahay (1–1) || — || Tropicana Field || 27,310 || 53–38 || L1
|- style="text-align:center; background-color:#bfb"
| 92 || July 15 || Indians || 1–0 || Martínez (12–3) || Colón (9–5) || — || Fenway Park || 33,501 || 54–38 || W1
|- style="text-align:center; background-color:#bfb"
| 93 || July 16 || Indians || 15–5 || Wakefield (11–4) || Gooden (3–4) || Lowe (1) || Fenway Park || 33,568 || 55–38 || W2
|- style="text-align:center; background-color:#fbb"
| 94 || July 17 || @ Tigers || 4–6 || Powell (1–1) || Cho (0–3) || Jones (17) || Tiger Stadium || 26,255 || 55–39 || L1
|- style="text-align:center; background-color:#bfb;"
| 95 || July 18 || @ Tigers || 9–4 || Avery (7–2) || Castillo (2–6) || Lowe (2) || Tiger Stadium || 22,983 || 56–39 || W1
|- style="text-align:center; background-color:#fbb;"
| 96 || July 19 || @ Tigers || 7–10 || Thompson (9–8) || Gordon (4–3) || — || Tiger Stadium || 21,018 || 56–40 || L1
|- style="text-align:center; background-color:#bfb;"
| 97 || July 21 (1)|| @ Indians || 10–7 || Martínez (13–3) || Gooden (3–5) || Gordon (27) || Jacobs Field || 42,874 || 57–40 || W1
|- style="text-align:center; background-color:#fbb;"
| 98 || July 21 (2)|| @ Indians || 2–4 (8)|| Ogea (3–2) || Wakefield (11–5) || Jackson (23) || Jacobs Field || 43,227 || 57–41 || L1
|- style="text-align:center; background-color:#fbb;"
| 99 || July 22 || @ Indians || 3–4 || Nagy (8–6) || Garcés (1–1) || Jackson (24) || Jacobs Field || 43,073 || 57–42 || L2
|- style="text-align:center; background-color:#bfb"
| 100 || July 23 || Blue Jays || 8–7 (10)|| Gordon (5–3) || Myers (3–3) || — || Fenway Park || 33,011 || 58–42 || W1
|- style="text-align:center; background-color:#fbb"
| 101 || July 24 || Blue Jays || 6–10 || Guzmán (5–12) || Avery (7–3) || Quantrill (2) || Fenway Park || 33,159 || 58–43 || L1
|- style="text-align:center; background-color:#bfb"
| 102 || July 25 || Blue Jays || 5–3 || Lowe (1–7) || Williams (9–5) || Gordon (28) || Fenway Park || 33,099 || 59–43 || W1
|- style="text-align:center; background-color:#bfb"
| 103 || July 26 || Blue Jays || 6–3 || Martínez (14–3) || Hentgen (9–8) || — || Fenway Park || 33,059 || 60–43 || W2
|- style="text-align:center; background-color:#bfb"
| 104 || July 28 || @ Athletics || 8–4 || Wakefield (12–5) || Haynes (7–4) || Gordon (29) || Network Associates Coliseum  || 11,208 || 61–43 || W3
|- style="text-align:center; background-color:#bfb"
| 105 || July 29 || @ Athletics || 10–2 || Wasdin (5–3) || Oquist (6–8) || Lowe (3) || Network Associates Coliseum || 11,632 || 62–43 || W4
|- style="text-align:center; background-color:#fbb"
| 106 || July 30 || @ Athletics || 5–6 || Rogers (11–4) || Avery (7–4) || Taylor (22) || Network Associates Coliseum || 17,535 || 62–44 || L1
|- style="text-align:center; background-color:#bfb"
| 107 || July 31 || @ Angels || 7–2 || Saberhagen (11–5) || Olivares (5–8) || Gordon (30) || Edison Field || 43,390 || 63–44 || W1
|-

|- style="text-align:center; background-color:#bfb"
| 108 || August 1 || @ Angels || 11–3 || Martínez (15–3) || Watson (4–7) || Lowe (4) || Edison Field || 29,893 || 64–44 || W2
|- style="text-align:center; background-color:#bfb"
| 109 || August 2 || @ Angels || 8–7 || Wakefield (13–5) || Dickson (9–9) || Gordon (31) || Edison Field || 35,763 || 65–44 || W3
|- style="text-align:center; background-color:#fbb"
| 110 || August 3 || @ Mariners || 1–3 || Cloude (6–7) || Wasdin (5–4) || Timlin (7) || Kingdome || 27,887 || 65–45 || L1
|- style="text-align:center; background-color:#bfb"
| 111 || August 4 || @ Mariners || 2–1 || Avery (8–4) || McCarthy (0–2) || Gordon (32) || Kingdome || 29,621 || 66–45 || W1
|- style="text-align:center; background-color:#fbb;"
| 112 || August 6 || @ Rangers || 7–4 || Burkett (7–11) || Saberhagen (11–6) || Wetteland (30) || The Ballpark at Arlington || 32,132 || 66–46 || L1
|- style="text-align:center; background-color:#fbb;"
| 113 || August 7 || @ Rangers || 3–4 || Helling (15–6) || Martínez (15–4) || Wetteland (31) || The Ballpark at Arlington || 34,906 || 66–47 || L2
|- style="text-align:center; background-color:#bfb;"
| 114 || August 8 || @ Rangers || 11–1 || Wakefield (14–5) || Sele (13–9) || — || The Ballpark at Arlington || 44,242 || 67–47 || W1
|- style="text-align:center; background-color:#bfb;"
| 115 || August 9 || @ Rangers || 14–8 || Corsi (3–1) || Stottlemyre (10–10) || — || The Ballpark at Arlington || 31,127 || 68–47 || W2
|- style="text-align:center; background-color:#bfb;"
| 116 || August 11 || Royals || 4–7 (10)|| Gordon (6–3) || Montgomery (1–4) || — || Fenway Park || 32,290 || 69–47 || W3
|- style="text-align:center; background-color:#fbb;"
| 117 || August 12 || Royals || 4–8 || Service (5–3) || Swindell (3–4) || — || Fenway Park || 32,488 || 69–48 || L1
|- style="text-align:center; background-color:#bfb;"
| 118 || August 13 || Twins || 8–7 || Eckersley (3–1) || Miller (0–2) || Gordon (33) || Fenway Park || 32,801 || 70–48 || W1
|- style="text-align:center; background-color:#bfb;"
| 119 || August 14 || Twins || 13–12 || Lowe (2–7) || Baptist (0–1) || Gordon (34) || Fenway Park || 32,888 || 71–48 || W2
|- style="text-align:center; background-color:#fbb;"
| 120 || August 15 || Twins || 2–3 || Rodriguez (2–2) || Schourek (7–7) || Aguilera (29) || Fenway Park || 32,412 || 71–49 || L1
|- style="text-align:center; background-color:#fbb"
| 121 || August 16 || Twins || 3–6 || Milton (7–9) || Avery (8–5) || Aguilera (30) || Fenway Park || 30,893 || 71–50 || L2
|- style="text-align:center; background-color:#bbb"
| — || August 17 || Rangers  || colspan=8|Postponed (rain). Makeup date August 18.
|- style="text-align:center; background-color:#bfb"
| 122 || August 18 (1)|| Rangers || 4–1 || Martínez (16–4) || Burkett (7–13) || Gordon (35) || Fenway Park || 33,201 || 72–50 || W1
|- style="text-align:center; background-color:#bfb"
| 123 || August 18 (2)|| Rangers || 5–4 || Lowe (3–7) || Patterson (1–5) || Gordon (36) || Fenway Park || 26,677 || 73–50 || W2
|- style="text-align:center; background-color:#bfb"
| 124 || August 19 || @ Royals || 11–1 || Wakefield (15–5) || Barber (0–1) || — || Kauffman Stadium || 14,017 || 74–50 || W3
|- style="text-align:center; background-color:#fbb"
| 125 || August 20 || @ Royals || 2–8 || Pichardo (7–8) || Schourek (7–8) || — || Kauffman Stadium || 14,278 || 74–51 || L1
|- style="text-align:center; background-color:#bfb"
| 126 || August 21 || @ Twins || 9–2 || Avery (9–5) || Milton (7–10) || — || Metrodome || 16,786 || 75–51 || W1
|- style="text-align:center; background-color:#fbb"
| 127 || August 22 || @ Twins || 3–4 || Trombley (4–3) || Swindell (3–5) || — || Metrodome || 18,415 || 75–52 || L1
|- style="text-align:center; background-color:#bfb;"
| 128 || August 23 || @ Twins || 5–1 || Martínez (17–4) || Radke (10–12) || — || Metrodome || 12,686 || 76–52 || W1
|- style="text-align:center; background-color:#bfb;"
| 129 || August 25 || Athletics || 3–2 || Swindell (4–5) || Rogers (12–6) || Gordon (37) || Fenway Park || 28,366 || 77–52 || W2
|- style="text-align:center; background-color:#bfb;"
| 130 || August 26 || Athletics || 7–4 || Wasdin (6–4) || Worrell (2–7) || Gordon (38) || Fenway Park || 26,379 || 78–52 || W3
|- style="text-align:center; background-color:#fbb"
| 131 || August 27 || Athletics || 3–6 || Candiotti (10–14) || Schourek (7–9) || Taylor (27) || Fenway Park || 31,239 || 78–53 || L1
|- style="text-align:center; background-color:#fbb"
| 132 || August 28 || Angels || 6–7 || Hill (9–5) || Avery (9–6) || — || Fenway Park || 32,470 || 78–54 || L2
|- style="text-align:center; background-color:#bfb;"
| 133 || August 29 || Angels || 6–1 || Martínez (18–4) || McDowell (3–3) || — || Fenway Park || 32,519 || 79–54 || W1
|- style="text-align:center; background-color:#fbb;"
| 134 || August 30 || Angels || 6–8 || Hasegawa (7–3) || Wakefield (15–6) || Percival (38) || Fenway Park || 31,476 || 79–55 || L1
|- style="text-align:center; background-color:#bfb;"
| 135 || August 31 || Mariners || 5–1 || Saberhagen (12–6) || Fassero (10–11) || — || Fenway Park || 28,553 || 80–55 || W1
|-

|- style="text-align:center; background-color:#fbb;"
| 136 || September 1 || Mariners || 3–7 || Moyer (12–8) || Lowe (3–8) || — || Fenway Park || 28,150 || 80–56 || L1
|- style="text-align:center; background-color:#bfb;"
| 137 || September 2 || Mariners || 7–3 || Gordon (7–3) || Ayala (1–10) || — || Fenway Park || 25,813 || 81–56 || W1
|- style="text-align:center; background-color:#fbb;"
| 138 || September 3 || @ Blue Jays || 3–4 (11)|| Person (3–0) || Veras (0–1) || — || SkyDome || 27,226 || 81–57 || L1
|- style="text-align:center; background-color:#fbb;"
| 139 || September 4 || @ Blue Jays || 1–12 || Hentgen (12–10) || Wakefield (15–7) || Steib (2) || SkyDome || 29,166 || 81–58 || L2
|- style="text-align:center; background-color:#fbb;"
| 140 || September 5 || @ Blue Jays || 3–4 || Clemens (18–6) || Saberhagen (12–7) || Quantrill (7) || SkyDome || 37,158 || 81–59 || L3
|- style="text-align:center; background-color:#fbb"
| 141 || September 6 ||  @ Blue Jays || 7–8 || Quantrill (3–4) || Lowe (3–9) || Person (1) || SkyDome || 38,374 || 81–60 || L4
|- style="text-align:center; background-color:#bfb"
| 142 || September 7 || Yankees || 4–3 || Swindell (5–5) || Wells (17–3) || Gordon (39) || Fenway Park || 32,106 || 82–60 || W1
|- style="text-align:center; background-color:#fbb"
| 143 || September 8 || Yankees || 2–3 || Cone (19–5) || Martínez (18–5) || Rivera (34) || Fenway Park || 33,409 || 82–61 || L1
|- style="text-align:center; background-color:#fbb"
| 144 || September 9 || Yankees || 5–7 || Mendoza (9–2) || Wakefield (15–8) || Rivera (35) || Fenway Park || 32,942 || 82–62 || L2
|- style="text-align:center; background-color:#bfb"
| 145 || September 11 || Tigers || 6–2 || Saberhagen (13–7) || Powell (3–7) || Gordon (40) || Fenway Park || 29,131 || 83–62 || W1
|- style="text-align:center; background-color:#fbb"
| 146 || September 12 || Tigers || 2–3 || Anderson (4–1) || Gordon (7–4) || Jones (24) || Fenway Park || 31,220 || 83–63 || L1
|- style="text-align:center; background-color:#fbb"
| 147 || September 13 || Tigers || 1–4 || Moehler (13–13) || Swindell (5–6) || Jones (25) || Fenway Park || 31,225 || 83–64 || L2
|- style="text-align:center; background-color:#fbb"
| 148 || September 14 || @ Yankees || 0–3 || Hernández (10–4) || Martínez (18–6) || — || Yankee Stadium || 42,725 || 83–65 || L3
|- style="text-align:center; background-color:#bfb"
| 149 || September 15 || @ Yankees  || 9–4 || Wakefield (16–8) || Jerzembeck (0–1) || — || Yankee Stadium || 43,218 || 84–65 || W1
|- style="text-align:center; background-color:#bfb;"
| 150 || September 16 || @ Orioles  || 4–3 || Saberhagen (14–7) || Erickson (15–12) || Gordon (41) || Camden Yards || 42,676 || 85–65 || W2
|- style="text-align:center; background-color:#bfb;"
| 151 || September 17 || @ Orioles || 3–2 || Eckersley (4–1) || Benítez (5–6) || Gordon (42) || Camden Yards || 44,565 || 86–65 || W3 
|- style="text-align:center; background-color:#fbb;"
| 152 || September 18 || @ White Sox || 9–11 || Parque (7–5) || Avery (9–7) || Simas (18) || Comiskey Park || 17,767 || 86–66 || L1 
|- style="text-align:center; background-color:#fbb;"
| 153 || September 19 || @ White Sox  || 2–5 || Snyder (7–2) || Martínez (18–7)  || — || Comiskey Park || 21,924 || 86–67 || L2
|- style="text-align:center; background-color:#fbb;"
| 154 || September 20 || @ White Sox  || 4–6 || Sirotka (13–15) || Corsi (3–2) || Ward (1) || Comiskey Park || 24,165 || 86–68 || L3
|- style="text-align:center; background-color:#bfb;"
| 155 || September 21 (1)|| Devil Rays  || 4–3 || Saberhagen (15–7) || Saunders (6–15) || Gordon (43) || Fenway Park || — || 87–68 || W1
|- style="text-align:center; background-color:#fbb"
| 156 || September 21 (2)|| Devil Rays || 4–8 || Wade (1–0) || Reyes (3–3) || — || Fenway Park || 23,379 || 87–69 || L1
|- style="text-align:center; background-color:#bfb"
| 157 || September 22 || Devil Rays || 11–2 || Schourek (8–9) || Santana (5–6) || — || Fenway Park || 20,339 || 88–69 || W1
|- style="text-align:center; background-color:#bfb"
| 158 || September 23 || Devil Rays || 5–4 || Avery (10–7) || Rekar (2–8) || Gordon (44) || Fenway Park || 23,240 || 89–69 || W2
|- style="text-align:center; background-color:#039"
| 159 || September 24 || Orioles || 9–6 || Martínez (19–7) || Ponson (8–9) || Gordon (45) || Fenway Park || 30,997 || 90–69 || W3
|- style="text-align:center; background-color:#bfb"
| 160 || September 25 || Orioles || 8–3 || Wakefield (17–8) || Fussell (0–1) || — || Fenway Park || 32,644 || 91–69 || W4
|- style="text-align:center; background-color:#fbb"
| 161 || September 26 || Orioles || 2–5 || Erickson (16–13) || Saberhagen (15–8) || Benítez (22) || Fenway Park || 29,226 || 91–70 || L1
|- style="text-align:center; background-color:#bfb"
| 162 || September 27 || Orioles || 6–4 || Valdez (1–0) || Mussina (13–10) || Gordon (46) || Fenway Park || 32,158 || 92–70 || W1
|-

|Reference:

 Postseason game log 

|- style="text-align:center; background:#bfb;"
| 1  || September 29 || @ Indians || 11–3 || Martínez (1–0) || Wright (0–1)  || — || Jacobs Field || 45,185 || 1–0 || W1
|- style="text-align:center; background:#fbb;"
| 2  || September 30 || @ Indians || 5–9 || Burba (1–0) || Wakefield (0–1) || Jackson (1) || Jacobs Field || 45,229 || 1–1 || L1
|- style="text-align:center; background:#fbb;"
| 3  || October 2 || Indians || 3–4 || Nagy (1–0) || Saberhagen (0–1) || Jackson (2) || Fenway Park || 33,114 || 1–2 || L2
|- style="text-align:center;  background:#fbb;"
| 4  || October 3 || Indians || 1–2 || Reed (1–0) || Gordon (0–1) || Jackson (3) || Fenway Park || 33,537 || 1–3 || L3 
|- style="text-align:center; style="background-color:#009900;"
|colspan="11" | Red Sox Lose Series 1–3'''
|-

Farm system 

Source:

References

External links 
 1998 Boston Red Sox team page at Baseball Reference
 1998 Boston Red Sox season at baseball-almanac.com

Boston Red Sox seasons
Boston Red Sox
Boston Red Sox
Red Sox